Alexander Zahlbruckner (31 May 1860, Svätý Jur – 1938, Vienna) was an Austrian-Hungarian botanist who specialized in the study of lichens. Johann Babtist Zahlbruckner, an earlier Austrian botanist, was his grandfather.

From 1878 to 1883 he studied at the University of Vienna, where his instructors included Anton Kerner von Marilaun and Julius Wiesner. Afterwards, he served as a voluntary assistant to Günther Beck von Mannagetta und Lerchenau at the Naturhistorisches Museum in Vienna, where he later attained the titles of assistant curator (from 1897), curator (from 1899) and head curator (from 1912). From 1918 until his retirement in 1922, he was director of the museum's botany department. From 1920, he was member of the Hungarian Academy of Sciences In retirement, he continued his studies in the field of lichenology.

In 1905 he served as general secretary of the International Botanical Congress, held in Vienna. Zahlbruckner is known for publication of Catalogus lichenum universalis, a catalog of all published names of lichens, issued in ten volumes from 1922 up until 1940. He also published regional works on lichen-forming fungi of central Africa, South America, China, Easter Island, Juan Fernández Islands, Dalmatia, Formosa, Japan, Java and Samoa. 

In 1910, botanist Albert William Herre published the fungal genus Zahlbrucknera (later Zahlbrucknerella) in Zahlbruckner's honour.

Works
Catalogus lichenum universalis. (Leipzig, Gebrüder Borntraeger, New York, Johnson Reprint Corp., 1922–1940).

Gallery

See also
 :Category: Taxa named by Alexander Zahlbruckner

Sources

External links
 
 Cybertruffle Zahlbruckner's Catalogus Lichenum Universalis (listing of lichen nomenclature published in ten volumes from 1922 to 1940.
 OCLC Classify Publications by Zahlbruckner. 

1860 births
1938 deaths
20th-century Austrian botanists
People from Svätý Jur
Austrian lichenologists
19th-century Austrian botanists